Beau Sia (born 1976) is an American slam poet.

Life and career
Sia was born in Ohio. He is of Chinese-Filipino descent. Raised in Oklahoma City, Oklahoma, Sia discovered spoken word poetry on MTV as a teenager.  When not participating in his high school's swim team, he spent time at Oklahoma City's only open mic night.

In 1995, Sia moved to New York City, where he attended the New York University's Tisch School of the Arts dramatic writing program. He has said that moving to New York City made him conscious of his identity as an Asian American, something that he denied often in Oklahoma City. His cultural identity became a common theme in his poems.

Sia began performing at the Nuyorican Poets Cafe, eventually earning himself a place on the 1996 Nuyorican National Poetry Slam team. That same year, he was filmed for the documentary SlamNation. The film followed Sia and his Nuyorican teammates (Saul Williams, Jessica Care Moore and muMs da Schemer) as they competed at the 1996 National Poetry Slam. The team went on to place third in the nation, and have a lasting impact on how people view slam poetry. In the book Words In Your Face: A Guided Tour Through Twenty Years of the New York City Poetry Slam, author Cristin O'Keefe Aptowicz wrote of Sia's impact, noting 

Sia's relationship with the Poetry Slam community continued. He eventually earned two National Poetry Slam Championships in 1997 and 2000 while competing on the NYC-Urbana national poetry slam team. He also reached second place in the Individual Poetry Slam competition in 2001.

Inspired to mischief by a reading A Night Without Armor – a book of poems by the folksinger Jewel – Sia composed a parody entitled A Night Without Armor II:  The Revenge.  It was reviewed for Entertainment Weekly by Alexandra Jacobs, who noted, “[Sia’s] deadpan parodies of such Jewel gems as ‘God Exists Quietly’ (‘inside my underwear/why don’t you come over/and say hello’)…have quickly won a following.”

Sia then began touring around Europe and the United States. He also appeared in films and published a wide range of his works in book and compact disc form. He also released an album on Mouth Almighty Records, a spoken-word imprint of Mercury/PolyGram Records that was active during the 1990s.

Style and examples
Sia's style is humorous and satirical. His word choice is often deceptively simple. A good example of his work is the poem "love," which was first performed at Marymount Manhattan College in 1996. It is featured on his CD Attack! Attack! Go!, as well as being included in the book Slam.

Works
 Sia, Beau. A Night Without Armor II: the Revenge. New York: Mouth Almighty Books, 1998.
 Sia, Beau. Attack! Attack! Go! Compact disc released in 1998 by Mouth Almighty/Mercury/PolyGram Records.
 Sia, Beau. The Undisputed Greatest Writer Of All Time. Long Beach: Write Bloody Publishing, 2012.
 Sia, Beau. WHITE POWER. Los Angeles: not a cult., 2017.

Inclusion in anthologies
 Cabico, Regie and Todd Swift, eds. Poetry Nation: The North American Anthology of Fusion Poetry. Vehicle Press, 1998.
 Colby, Todd, ed. Heights of the Marvelous : A New York Anthology'. St. Martin's Griffin, 2000. (On the Amazon.com listing for this book, "Seau Bia" posts a review that is nothing but a plea for attention to Beau Sia.)
 Glazner, Gary Mex, ed. Poetry Slam: The Competitive Art of Performance Poetry. San Francisco: Manic D Press, 2000.
 von Ziegesar, Cecily, ed. Slam. New York: Alloy Books, 2000. (This book also includes quotes by Sia on what poetry is, the writing process, etc.)
 Sanchez, Sonia; Medina, Tony; and Rivera, Lois Reyes, eds. Bum Rush the Page: A Def Poetry Jam. Three Rivers Press, 2001.
 Katz, Daniel R., ed. Why Freedom Matters: The Spirit of the Declaration of Independence in Prose, Poetry, and Song from 1776 to the Present . Workman Publishing Company, 2003.
 Glazner, Gary Mex. How to Make a Living as a Poet. (Interview) Soft Skull Press, 2005.
 Brown, Derrick C. The Last American Valentine: Illustrated poems to seduce and destroy Write Bloody Publishing, 2008.
 Eleveld, Mark, ed. "The Spoken Word Revolution Redux". Sourcebooks MediaFusion, 2007

Film and television
Sia's appearances on television were on Def Poetry; he later appeared in the Broadway version, Def Poetry Jam.

He appeared in Slam in 1998 as Jimmy Huang. The same year, he participated in the documentary SlamNation as himself. Later appearances include The Manchurian Candidate (2004) as a late-night comedian on television andHitch (2005) as Duane Reade Clerk.

Sia portrays the protagonist in the music video for Wolf Like Me by the band TV on the Radio.

Sia plays Norman Sklear, a wedding czar emcee in Rachel Getting Married (2008).

In 2015, Sia appeared in yet another Jonathan Demme film, Ricki and the Flash, followed by a recurring role on the web series Pretty Dudes alongside such actors as Dion Basco and Yoshi Sudarso.

Video games
Sia, in collaboration with former Gearbox Software writer Anthony Burch, created the narrative for the exploration video game Failsafe.

References

Bibliography
 Glazner, Gary Mex, ed. Poetry Slam: The Competitive Art of Performance Poetry. San Francisco: Manic D Press, 2000. 
 Sia, Beau. A Night Without Armor II: the Revenge. New York: Mouth Almighty Books, 1998. 
 von Ziegesar, Cecily, ed. Slam. New York: Alloy Books, 2000. 

Online
 Audio of "8 Year Old Reject" and "What I Did Last Summer" on Salon.com
 Audio of "Howl," "Money," "Gym" and "G.I. Joe Freestyle" on Indiefeed Performance Poetry Channel
 Mouth Almighty interview
 The Angry Poet: Beau Sia
 
 Article on Russell Simmons Def Poetry Jam by the New York Daily News Preview for "The Drums Inside Your Chest" Poetry concert film featuring Beau Sia

External links
 
 Article regarding Beau in Slam'' at ColorLines Magazine
 Interview by the Philadelphia City Paper
 PlanetAUTHORity interview
 Scene Missing Magazine Interviews Beau Sia
 Is There A Future For Spoken Word? @ dropmagazine.com

1976 births
American male poets
American satirists
Living people
Tisch School of the Arts alumni
Writers from Oklahoma City
Slam poets
Mercury Records artists
Place of birth missing (living people)
American spoken word poets
American poets
American writers of Chinese descent
American people of Chinese descent
American poets of Asian descent
American writers of Filipino descent
Comedians from Oklahoma
American male non-fiction writers
21st-century American comedians